Law No. 81 of 1991 —better known as the Autonomous Municipalities Act of 1991— is the extraconstitutional Puerto Rican law that regulates the local government of all the municipalities of Puerto Rico. It was enacted in order to repeal many different and dispersed laws that governed them. Today, the Act serves as a broad and encompassing body of law that covers all the different aspects of a municipality, including its mayor, the mayor's office, and the municipal assemblies.

References

External links
 

+
Puerto Rican law